WIIH-CD, virtual channel 17 (VHF digital channel 8), is a low-powered, Class A getTV-affiliated television station licensed to Indianapolis, Indiana, United States. Locally owned by Circle City Broadcasting, it is a sister station to Circle City's duopoly of Indianapolis-licensed CW affiliate WISH-TV (channel 8) and Marion-licensed MyNetworkTV affiliate WNDY-TV (channel 23). The three stations share studios on North Meridian Street (at the north end of the Television Row section) on the near north side of Indianapolis; WIIH-CD's transmitter is located on Walnut Drive in the Augusta section of the city's northwest side (near Meridian Hills).

Even though WIIH-CD broadcasts a digital signal of its own, its broadcast radius is limited to the immediate Indianapolis area. It is therefore simulcast on WISH-TV's second digital subchannel (VHF channel 9.2 or virtual channel 8.2 via PSIP) in order to reach the entire market.

History

Early history
The station first signed on the air on January 29, 1988 as W11BV, broadcasting on VHF channel 11. Its original owner, White River Corporation, sold the station to Indiana Broadcasting Corporation, the subsidiary of LIN Broadcasting Corporation (predecessor to LIN Media) that held the license for WISH-TV, on December 21, 1992. The station changed its call letters to WIIH-LP in 1995. In 2002, WIIH moved its allocation to UHF channel 17 and received approval from the Federal Communications Commission (FCC) to reclassify its license to Class A status, modifying its calls to WIIH-CA in the process. In 2003, the station became the market's Univision affiliate, branding as "Univision Indiana". Soon afterward, WISH-TV began producing a nightly Spanish-language newscast for WIIH-CA (titled WIIH Noticias), which was cancelled in 2008. On May 18, 2007, LIN TV announced that it was exploring strategic alternatives that could result in the sale of the company.

On September 15, 2008, LIN and Time Warner Cable entered into an impasse during negotiations for new retransmission consent deals for some of the group's television stations. Bright House Networks, a major cable provider for Indianapolis, negotiates carriage contracts through Time Warner Cable. LIN TV requested compensation for carriage in a manner similar to cable networks, as other broadcast station owners began to seek compensation from pay television providers for their programming. The agreement with Bright House expired on October 2. By 12:35 a.m. on October 3, Time Warner Cable and Bright House Networks substituted WIIH, WISH and WNDY as well as LIN's other television stations around the country with other cable channels in markets where the group owns or manages stations and both providers maintain systems. Locally, WISH and WNDY were restored 23 days later on October 26 after LIN reached a groupwide carriage agreement with TWC/Bright House; however, WIIH-CA was excluded from the deal. By 2008, Indianapolis had grown to become the 57th largest media market based on the local Hispanic population in the United States.

On January 1, 2009, the station dropped Univision programming after LIN failed to renew its contract with the network (which expired the day before on December 31, 2008), and adopted a weather-focused programming format, branded as "LWS: Local Weather Station". As a result, two other pay television providers in the Indianapolis market, Comcast and AT&T U-verse secured carriage agreements with Univision to receive its programming from the network's national feed; however, Bright House decided not to pursue a contract with the network at that time.

As a WISH-TV translator
On January 29, 2010, LIN TV filed an application to the FCC to operate a fill-in translator station for WISH-TV using WIIH-LD's UHF channel 17 signal, to serve areas of Indianapolis that experienced problems receiving the WISH-TV signal after the transition. The Commission granted a construction permit to build transmitter facilities for this purpose on June 16, 2010.

The FCC cancelled WIIH-CA's analog license on January 13, 2011, when WIIH-LD was converted into a fill-in translator of WISH-TV (LWS programming remained on digital subchannel 8.2 on WISH-TV and was moved to that same mapped subchannel on both WIIH-CD with the translator conversion). In September 2011, LIN Media filed an application to the FCC to upgrade the WIIH-LD license to Class A status. After the move was approved by the FCC, WIIH's call letters were modified to WIIH-CD.

On March 21, 2014, Media General announced that it would merge with LIN Media in a $1.6 billion deal. The merger was completed on December 19.

Analog-to-digital conversion
WIIH-CA shut down its analog signal on September 9, 2009, and flash cut its digital signal into operation on VHF channel 8 (the former analog and current virtual channel allocation of WISH-TV, which it vacated upon the June 12 digital television transition).

References

External links
 - WISH-TV official website

Mass media in Indianapolis
GetTV affiliates
IIH-CD
Low-power television stations in the United States
Television channels and stations established in 1988
1998 establishments in Indiana